Turner Motorsport (Also known as TMS Racing or Turner racing ) is a professional  sports car racing team located in Newton, NH, and is the second most prolific BMW privateer racing team in the world, second only to Schnitzer Motorsport, who stopped racing in 2020.  As of 2021 Turner motorsport has competed in over 410 professional sport car races.

Turner motorsport has exclusively raced BMW models professionally since 1998, including the BMW 3 Series ,  BMW M3 coupes, and the M6 in the IMSA. Previously, the team was highly successful in the Speed World Challenge Touring Car series.

History 

Turner Motorsport won the 2003 and 2004 Speed World Challenge Touring Car Championships, breaking an eight-year Honda / Acura domination of the series. After winning the championship the second consecutive time, Turner Motorsport left World Challenge to race in the 2005 Grand-Am Cup series. Turner Motorsport won both the 2006 Grand Am Cup GS (BMW E46 M3) and ST Driver and Team Championships (BMW E46 330i) and the 2007 Grand Am Cup ST Championship (BMW E46 330i). Turner Motorsport was the first team to win dual GS and ST driver and team championships in the same season. A fourth Grand Am Championship came in 2011 (BMW E92 M3) for driver Paul Dalla Lana. Dalla Lana was also honored by BMW with the 2011 BMW Sports Trophy, given to the most successful BMW privateer racer in the world.

Turner Motorsport also raced an E46 BMW M3 in the SCCA Club Racing T2 Class, Will Turner finished 3rd in the 2006 SCCA Runoffs at Heartland Park Topeka in Topeka, Kansas.

In 2014, Turner Motorsport switched from the Grand-Am Rolex Sports Car Series to its successor, the WeatherTech SportsCar Championship (a merger of Grand-Am and the American LeMans Series). Turner competes in the GT Daytona class (GTD) in the  Championship with a GTD / GT3 BMW M6, and has thus far taken class wins at the Monterey Grand Prix at WeatherTech Raceway Laguna Seca, as well as the famous Six Hours of Watkins Glen, the first major endurance win for the team, and followed up with wins at Road America and Virginia. The strength of those four wins was enough to propel driver Dane Cameron to the Driver's Championship in 2014, Turner to the Team Championship, but not BMW to the Manufacturer's championship.

List of championships 

2003 Speed World Challenge Driver
2004 Speed World Challenge Driver
2006 Grand-Am Cup ST Driver
2006 Grand-Am Cup Team
2006 Grand-Am Cup GS Driver
2007 Grand-Am Cup ST Driver
2011 Continental Tire Sports Car Challenge Driver
2011 Continental Tire Sports Car Challenge Team
2014 Tudor United SportsCar GT-Daytona Driver
2014 Tudor United SportsCar GT-Daytona Team

Past drivers
Dane Cameron
Augusto Farfus
Pedro Lamy
Paul Dalla Lana
Bill Auberlen
Joey Hand
Don Salama
Billy Johnson
Tom Kimber-Smith
Dirk Müller
Dirk Werner
Jörg Müller
Maxime Martin
Gunter Schaldach
Anders Hainer
Chris Gleason
Adam Burrows
Trevor Hopwood
Michael Marsal 
Markus Palttala
Will Turner

References

External links
Official Site (Racing)
Official Site

American auto racing teams
Grand American Road Racing Association teams
WeatherTech SportsCar Championship teams
Auto tuning companies
BMW in motorsport